Nawapol Thamrongrattanarit (born 4 February 1984) is a Thai writer, screenwriter and film director. His notable work are "Mary Is Happy, Mary Is Happy" and "Heart Attack" which has won several awards in the Suphannahong National Film Awards.

Filmography

Feature films
 36 (2012)
 Mary Is Happy, Mary Is Happy (2013)
 The Master (2014)
 Heart Attack (2015)
 Die Tomorrow (2017)
 BNK48 Girls Don't Cry (2018)
 Happy Old Year (2019)
 Fast and Feel Love (2022)

Short films
 The Temptation (2009)
 Mr. Mee wanna go to Egypt (2009)
 Francais (2009)
 Cherie is Korean-Thai (2010)
 Panatipata (2010)
 I Believe That Over 1 Million People Hate Maythawee (2011)
 SORRY (2012)
 20 Scenes of June (2012)
 Patcha is Sexy (2014)
 Exotic (2014)
 Scene 37 (2014)
 Scene 38 (2015)
 Scene 39 (2016)
 Scene 40 (2017)
 Friendshit (2017)
 FACE/OFF (2018)

Music videos 
 Slur - "Noob" (2010)
 Muanpair Panaboot - "Chan Pid Tee Kid Wa Rao Rak Gun" (2012)
 Greasy Cafe - "Moon" (2013)
 Stamp - "Keyboard Hustle" (2014)
 Yellow Fang - "Selfish" (2014)
 Watcharapong Tantek - "The Letter" (2016)

Screenplay 
 Bangkok Traffic Love Story (2009)
 The Billionaire (2011)
 Seven Something segment "14" (2012)
 Home segment "The Wedding" (2012)

References

External links
Nawapol Thamrongrattanarit official website

Nawapol Thamrongrattanarit
Nawapol Thamrongrattanarit
Living people
1984 births
Nawapol Thamrongrattanarit